HNK Dubrovnik 1919 was a Croatian football club based in the city of Dubrovnik.

History
The club was founded in 1922 under the name NK Jug. It was created by merging with another club Dubrovnik, hence there in 1919 in its name. During the 1951 merged with Borac and Željezničar and renamed NK Dubrovnik.

In 1978 again takes the original name NK Jug, and next year is merged with other urban club, GOŠK. The club is called GOŠK Jug. Under this name entered in the former Yugoslavia's 2nd Federal League and remain in it ten years ago.

Foundation of the Croatian football league, the club clinches 1. HNL, 19 February 1992 name was changed to HNK Dubrovnik. Later, the club sinks deeper into a serious crisis due to the 2nd League of Dubrovnik-Neretva County.

In August 2015, Dubrovnik 1919 was merged with the city rivals GOŠK and then was dissolved.

Seasons

References

External links
Official website

Association football clubs established in 1919
Association football clubs disestablished in 2015
Defunct football clubs in Croatia
Football clubs in Dubrovnik-Neretva County
Football clubs in Yugoslavia
HNK Dubrovnik 1919
1919 establishments in Croatia
2015 disestablishments in Croatia